Robert Aslett (born ) was an assistant cashier at the Bank of England under Abraham Newland, condemned to death in 1803 for embezzling Exchequer Bills believed to amount to around £500,000. His sentence was commuted to one of imprisonment.

Aslett's disgrace led to the appointment of Henry Hase as chief cashier. He was a nephew of Abraham Newland.

References 

People associated with the Bank of England
1750s births
Year of death missing
British fraudsters